Bye may refer to:
 BYE, UNDP county code for Belarus
Bye (cricket), a special type of run scored in the game of cricket
Bye (sports), when a player or team is allowed to advance to the next round of a playoff tournament without playing
Bye (surname)
Bye (film)
"Bye", a song by Elliott Smith from Figure 8
”BYE” a 2021 single by American artist Jaden Smith

See also
Bye Bye (disambiguation)
Goodbye (disambiguation)
Parting phrase